Slaklielva is a river in northwestern Sørkapp Land at Spitsbergen, Svalbard. The river flows from Gråkallbreen through Slaklidalen and across Breinesflya at the western coast.

References

Rivers of Spitsbergen